Patrick Alfred 'Paddy' Bugden (18 December 1918 – 17 February 1993) was an Australian rugby league footballer  who played in the 1940s.

Playing career

Bugden started his rugby league career at Marist Brothers, Lismore, New South Wales. He was a half-back who played five seasons for Newtown between 1942–1943 and 1945–1947. He also played one season with Western Suburbs in 1944.

The highlight of his career was playing in Newtown's winning 1943 Grand Final winning team that defeated North Sydney.

Bugden died on 17 February 1993, aged 74.

References

1918 births
1993 deaths
Australian rugby league players
Newtown Jets players
Rugby league halfbacks
Rugby league players from Lismore, New South Wales
Western Suburbs Magpies captains
Western Suburbs Magpies coaches
Western Suburbs Magpies players